The Congregation for Humanistic Judaism of Metro Detroit (founded as The Birmingham Temple) was the first Humanistic Jewish congregation.

As being part of the Humanistic Judaism movement, the congregation observes holidays, traditions and rituals focused on the humanistic and cultural aspects of Judaism, rather than the religious aspects. For example: for Bar/Bat Mitzvah, the Jewish boy or girl picks a hero that he or she connects with and writes a thesis, which is ultimately given to the congregation. The person works with a mentor, a senior member at the temple, in studying many different heroes before finally choosing one to write the paper on. The paper highlights important contributions the individual makes/made in his or her life to humanity, and why and how the hero was humanistic. All traditions in Humanistic Jewish congregations follow secular and humanistic ideals; followers believe the religion to be an ancestral religion than a religion of salvation.

History
The Congregation for Humanistic Judaism of Metro Detroit was founded in 1963 by Rabbi Sherwin Wine (formerly an assistant rabbi at Temple Beth El) and eight founding families, who originally intended that the congregation would be located in Birmingham, Michigan (a suburb of Detroit).  The temple originally followed many Reform practices but within six months decided to drop most of these (as well as all mentions of God in the services), and began to pursue a humanist philosophy.  

The congregation's first services were at Eagle Elementary School, and then at Highmeadow School, in Farmington; later services moved to the Masonic Temple, Birmingham Unitarian Church, and from 1965 to 1971 at Frost Middle School in Livonia.  Finally, in 1971, the temple moved to its current location on Twelve Mile Road in Farmington Hills.  The temple began publishing the journal Humanistic Judaism in 1967. In the words of one writer, the temple has "sought to define a primarily secular Jewish identity" and has "steered a clearly liberal political and humanistic moral course."

Tamara Kolton became the senior rabbi of the Congregation for Humanistic Judaism of Metro Detroit in 2003. In 2007, Sherwin Wine died in an automobile accident. In 2013 Jeffrey Falick became the new rabbi of the Congregation for Humanistic Judaism of Metro Detroit.

References

External links
Congregation for Humanistic Judaism of Metro Detroit official website

Humanistic synagogues in the United States
Organizations established in 1963
Synagogues in Michigan
1963 establishments in Michigan